Jean Antoine Ernest Troisier (18 May 1881 – 31 October 1945) was a French doctor and biologist who headed a laboratory of the Pasteur Institute for several years. He was recognized as an authority on tuberculosis and cancer.

Early years

Jean Antoine Ernest Troisier was the son of Charles Émile Troisier, professor of medicine at the University of Paris.
His daughter, Solange Troisier (1919–2008) was a doctor and a leading feminist.

From 1903 to 1905 Troisier was an extern at the Hôpitaux de Paris while studying under Louis Landouzy and Anatole Chauffard.
From 1906 to 1909 he was an intern at the Hôpitaux de Paris.
In 1909 Troisier and Georges Roux described experimental research they had conducted on the tetanus toxin at a meeting of the Société Médicale des Hôpitaux.
Troiser was one of the French researchers who undertook a thorough study of pigments of bilirubin or a similar substance in haemorrhagic effusions. He published a doctoral thesis describing his work and that of others until 1910.
His thesis was titled Rôle des Hémolysines dans les genèse des pigments biliaires et de l'urobiline (role of hemolysin in the genesis of bile pigments and Urobilin).

Career

Troisier was appointed head of the medical clinic at the Hôpital Laennec (Paris) in 1910.
From 1911–22 he was head of pathological anatomy and bacteriology at the Medical Faculty of Paris, where he studied the role of hemolysins in the process of degradation of hemoglobin.
At the French Medical Congress in Lyon on 21–25 October 1911 Troisier and Georges Guillain presented their findings on the causes and effects of the destruction of blood corpuscles and its relationship to jaundice.
He began research in icterohemorrhagic spirochetoses in 1914–18. In 1921 he was appointed a Doctor of the Hôpitaux de Paris.
Troisier was named laboratory head at the Pasteur Institute in 1926. 
He was responsible for the "monkey" laboratory, funded by Princess Marie Bonaparte of Greece.
She was a close friend of the family.
This laboratory undertook experiments on non human primates.
From 1920–31 Troisier researched subjects such as the etiology and pathogenesis of meningeal spirochaetose; transplants of human cancers in chimpanzees, tuberculosis, typhus fever and the blood groups of chimpanzees.
From 1931–38 he studied tuberculosis; acute spirochaetose; spotted fever; microbial diseases; blood diseases and the genetic study of varicose veins.

Troisier was head doctor at the Hôpital Sainte-Perrine (1927–28) and the Hôpital Bichat (1929–31) in Paris.
From 1932 to 1938 he was responsible for experimental pathology at the faculty of medicine in Paris.
He also worked as head doctor at the Hôpital de Beaujon, Hôpital de Beaujon-Clichy and Hôpital Laennec in this period.
In 1933 he and Yves Boquien published a monograph that gave a complete account of current understanding of Meningeal Spirochaetosis, covering historical, pathological, clinical and experimental aspects.
In 1935 he published a 280-page book on "Recent Experimental Studies on Infectious Diseases" (Études expérimentales récentes sur les maladies infectieuses). It discussed viral diseases, spirochaetosis and related diseases, bacterial infections such as typhoid fever and tetanus, infections due to acid-fast bacilli including leprosy and tuberculosis, agranulocytosis and kidney diseases. 
A reviewer said "The description of the various diseases is clear and concise, but in a work of this kind the absence of an index and a bibliography is regrettable."

In 1938 Troisier was made a knight of the Legion of Honour. He continued to work at the Hôpital Laennec and the Institut Pasteur, studying tuberculosis and other subjects.
In 1943 he was elected a member of the Académie Nationale de Médecine.
His 103-page 1944 monograph co-authored with  J. van der Stegen, Méthode génétique et tuberculose pulmonaire, was derided by one reviewer, who wrote, "Without reservation, the book can be recommended for the purpose of demonstrating how studies in human genetics should not be conducted.
At the time of his death on 31 October 1945 at the age of 64 he was professor at the Paris faculty of medicine and the Institut Pasteur, and was recognized as an authority on tuberculosis and cancer.

Selected publications

References

Sources

Further reading 

1881 births
1945 deaths
French pathologists